Loca piel (English: Crazy Skin) is a 1996 Chilean telenovela produced and broadcast by TVN.

Cast 
 Bastián Bodenhöfer as Guillermo Carter.
 Javiera Contador as Verónica Alfaro.
 Álvaro Escobar as Martín Page.
 Ana María Gazmuri as Paula Green.
 Jael Ünger as Pilar Lynch.
 Jaime Vadell as Gerardo Page.
 Sonia Viveros as Trinidad Yávar.
 Eduardo Barril as Eladio Alfaro.
 Consuelo Holzapfel as Gisela Bonfante.
 Mauricio Pesutic as Hernán Cañas.
 Alejandra Fosalba as Manuela Phillips.
 Tamara Acosta as Danitza Torres / Lorena Torres.
 Renato Münster as Emilio Duval.
 Paola Volpato as María Olivia Carter.
 Silvia Santelices as Irene Claro.
 Rodolfo Bravo as Robinson Torres.
 Patricia Guzmán as Úrsula de Torres.
 Schlomit Baytelman as Diana Balbontín.
 Patricio Strahovsky as Álvaro Renán.
 Patricia Rivadeneira as Estela Benque.
 Rodrigo Bastidas as Jaime Benavente.
 Rosita Nicolet as Vilma Zevallos.
 Solange Lackington as Genoveva Flores.
 Luz Jiménez as Bernarda.
 Tito Bustamante as Domingo.
 Yuyuniz Navas as Alejandra Foster.
 Francisco Pérez-Bannen as Vicente Cruz.
 Monica Godoy as Javiera Renán.
 Paulo Meza as Alexis Torres.
 Pamela Villalba as Yolanda.
 Nicolás Fontaine as Gabriel Renán.
 Gloria Canales as Glorita.
 Josefina Velasco as Rita.
 Gabriel Prieto as Rolando "Rolo".
 Nicolás Huneeus as Dante.
 Karin Wilkomirsky as María Flores "Mary Flowers".
 Christián González as Miguel Ángel.
 Sebastián Arrau as Antonio Blanco.
 Jorge Hevia Jr. as Rodrigo Carter.
 Camila Guzmán as María Ignacia Renán.

Special participations 
 Juan Bennett as Renato Green.
 Humberto Gallardo as Profesor Poblete.
 Victoria Gazmuri as María José.
 Catalina Olcay as Soraya.
 Óscar Hernández as Capitán de Bomberos.
 Jorge Zabaleta as Cajero bancario.
 Carolina Cuturrufo
 Jeanette Espinoza
 Paola Gambino

Soundtrack 
Volume 1
 Ryo - Loca Piel
 Alberto Plaza - Bandido (Tema de Martín)
 Luz Casal - Entre Mis Recuerdos (Tema de Trinidad y Gerardo)
 Gémini - Calor (Tema de Manuela)
 Los Chulos - Eres Más (Tema de Danitza y Dante)
 Egóticos - Estamos Bien (Tema de Verónica)
 Biagio Antonaccia & Sergio Dalma - No Sé A Quien Debo Creer (Tema de Álvaro)
 Antonella Arancio - Recuerdos Del Alma (Tema de Paula)
 Buddy Richard - Si Una Vez (Tema de Úrsula)
 Myriam Hernández & Paul Anka - Tu Cabeza En Mi Hombro (Tema de Gerardo y Pilar)
 Marcos Llunas - Vida (Tema de Alejandra y Hernán)
 Andrea Tessa - Como Pez En El Agua (Tema de Yolanda)
 Pablo Dagnino - Dejo Las llaves (Tema de Gabriel)
 Zucchero - El Vuelo (Tema de Guillermo)
 Ricky Martin - Te Extraño, Te Olvido, Te Amo (Tema de Javiera y Vicente)
 Luis Eduardo Aute - Alevosía
 Aleste - Mundo Salvaje
 Millie - Por Primera Vez
 Mal Corazón - Eternos Días de Invierno
 Los de más Abajo - La Colita
 Paradisio - Bailando
 Me & My - Dub I Dub (Tema de María)
 Ana Cirré - El cielo del Tibet (Tema de amor de Verónica)
 Sandy & Papo - Mueve, Mueve (Tema de Danitza)

Volume 2
 Illya Kuryaki & The Valderramas - Abarajame
 Zimbabwe - Paseo Nocturno
 Lucybell - Cuando Respiro tu Boca
 Pánico - Demasiada Confusión
 Panteras Negras - Pitta 2 (Cuidado con el Punga)
 La Pozze Latina - La Subida
 Lord Bayron - Cofra
 Jovanotti - Ragazzo Fortunato
 La Dolce Vitta - Amor a la Mala
 Los Vándalos - Tonight
 La Portuaria - Supermambo
 Chancho En Piedra - Guach Perry
 Anachena - Soft

Volume 3
PURE ROCK BALLADS 
 Bon Jovi - Always 
 Joan Osborne - One Of Us 
 U2 - I Still Haven't Found What I'm Looking For
 The Cranberries - Ode To My Family
 Sheryl Crow - Run Baby Run
 INXS - Never Tear Us Apart
 Paul Weller - You Do Something To Me
 The Who - Behind Blue Eyes
 Elton John - Believe
 Zucchero Feat. Paul Young - Senza Una Donna
 Eric Clapton - Wonderful Tonight
 J.J. Cale - After Midnight
 Faith No More - Easy
 Del Amitri - Driving With The Brakes On
 Texas - So In Love With You
 Extreme - More Than Words
 Ugly Kid Joe - Cats In The Cradle
 Scorpions - Wind Of Change

External links 
 

1996 telenovelas
1996 Chilean television series debuts
1997 Chilean television series endings
Chilean telenovelas
Spanish-language telenovelas
Televisión Nacional de Chile telenovelas